This is a list of the mountains of Norway, ordered by their topographic prominence.  On the island Jan Mayen, a Norwegian administered island northeast of Iceland, the volcano Beerenberg has a height and prominence , and on the island Spitsbergen in Svalbard, the mountain Newtontoppen has height and prominence . For a list by height, see list of mountains in Norway by height.

See also
 List of mountains in Norway by height
 List of mountains by prominence

References
 
 

Mountains of Norway
Norway, by prominence
Mountains in Norway by prominence